Stebbins may refer to:

People with the surname 
 Alice Stebbins Wells, the first female American police officer
Catharine A. F. Stebbins (1823-1904), American abolitionist and suffragist
 Charles Stebbins, American politician
 Cyril A. Stebbins, American agricultural educator
 Emma Stebbins, American sculptress
 G. Ledyard Stebbins, American botanist and geneticist
 Genevieve Stebbins (1857–1934), American author, teacher, performer
 Harrison Stebbins, American politician
 Henry G. Stebbins, American politician and president of the New York Stock Exchange
 Joel Stebbins, American astronomer
 Lucy Ward Stebbins, Dean of Women at University of California, Berkeley
 Michael Stebbins, American geneticist and science writer
 Nathaniel Livermore Stebbins, American marine photographer
 Raymond Stebbins, American attorney and political activist
 Richard Stebbins, American athlete
 Robert C. Stebbins, American herpetologist and illustrator
 Theodore Stebbins, American art historian, curator and academic
 De Wayne Stebbins, Wisconsin State Senator from 1895 to 1903

Fictional characters
 Purley Stebbins, American police sergeant in the Nero Wolfe series
Stebbins, character in The Long Walk

Places
United States
 Stebbins, Alaska, a town
 Stebbins Corners, a location in Sherman (town), New York
 Stebbinsville, Wisconsin, an unincorporated community
 Stebbins High School, Ohio
 Stebbins Hall, a residential hall, University of California, Berkeley campus, California

Other uses
 Si Stebbins, a card stack system used in magic (published by William Coffrin, AKA Si Stebbins)
 2300 Stebbins, an asteroid
 Stebbins (crater), a lunar crater named for Joel Stebbins
 A Field Guide to Western Reptiles and Amphibians, commonly known as Stebbins after its author Robert C. Stebbins

English-language surnames
Lists of people by surname